Lander may refer to:

Media and entertainment 
 Lander (computer game), computer game published by Psygnosis in 1999
 Lander (game demo), the 3D game demo provided with the Acorn Archimedes computer
 Lander (Transformers), a fictional character in the Transformers series
 Lunar Lander (arcade game), an arcade game
 Lunar Lander (video game series), one of several video games

Places 
United States
 Lander College for Men, a Jewish college in New York
 Lander County, Nevada, United States
 Lander Crossing, California, United States
 Lander, Maryland, United States
 Lander, Pennsylvania, United States
 Lander University, a public university in South Carolina
 Lander, Wyoming, United States

Venezuela
 Lander Municipality

Science 
 Benthic lander, oceanographic measuring platform which sits on the seabed or benthic zone
 Lander (crater), lunar crater
 Lander (spacecraft), type of spacecraft, designed for descending the surface of an astronomical body

Other uses 
 Lander (surname)
 Lander (foreigner), a foreigner

See also 
 Länder
 Landers (disambiguation)
 Flatlander (disambiguation)
 Outlander (disambiguation)